Rashid Salim Al-Ma'shari (born 1 January 1978) is an Omani swimmer. He competed in the 1996 Summer Olympics.

References

1978 births
Living people
Swimmers at the 1996 Summer Olympics
Omani male swimmers
Olympic swimmers of Oman